Phoradendron macrophyllum is a species of flowering plant in the sandalwood family known by the common names Colorado Desert mistletoe, bigleaf mistletoe, and Christmas mistletoe. It is native to western United States and northern Mexico from Oregon to Colorado to Texas to Baja California, where it grows in many types of wooded habitat at elevations up to 1700 m (5500 feet).

This mistletoe is a parasitic plant on a variety of trees and woody shrubs, including species of alder, ash, walnut, sycamore, poplar, mesquite, and willow. It is known from over 60 species of hardwood trees, but it has not been reported on oaks.

It is a shrub producing many erect green branches which can exceed a meter long. Its stems are lined with pairs of oppositely arranged leaves, each rounded or oval in shape and 3 to 4 centimeters long. As a hemiparasite the mistletoe taps its host tree for water and nutrients but contains some chlorophyll and can photosynthesize some energy for itself as well. The plant is dioecious, with male and female individuals producing different forms of inflorescence with rough elongated clusters of flowers. Female flowers yield white to light pink spherical berries each 4 or 5 millimeters wide.

References

External links
Jepson Manual Treatment for Phoradendron macrophyllum
USDA Plants Profile of Phoradendron macrophyllum ssp. macrophyllum
San Diego Natural History Museum: Natural History of Holiday Plants
Phoradendron macrophyllum — UC Photo gallery

macrophyllum
Parasitic plants
Flora of Northeastern Mexico
Flora of Northwestern Mexico
Flora of the Southwestern United States
Flora of Arizona
Flora of Baja California
Flora of California
Flora of Chihuahua (state)
Flora of New Mexico
Flora of Oregon
Flora of Sonora
Flora of Texas
Flora of the California desert regions
Flora of the Chihuahuan Desert
Flora of the Sierra Nevada (United States)
Flora of the Sonoran Deserts
Flora of the Rio Grande valleys
Natural history of the California Coast Ranges
Natural history of the Colorado Desert
Natural history of the Mojave Desert
Dioecious plants
Flora without expected TNC conservation status